Saad Al-Dosari (17 June 1977 – 30 December 2004) was a Saudi Arabian football midfielder who played for Saudi Arabia in the 2004 AFC Asian Cup.

Death
30 December 2004 Al-Dosari died as a result of a car accident in Al-Hasa in the Eastern Province, Saudi Arabia.

References 

1977 births
2004 deaths
Saudi Arabian footballers
Saudi Arabia international footballers
Association football midfielders
Al-Riyadh SC players
Al-Ahli Saudi FC players
Al Hilal SFC players
2004 AFC Asian Cup players
Saudi Professional League players
People from Riyadh Province
Road incident deaths in Saudi Arabia